The çifteli (çiftelia, qifteli or qyfteli) is a plucked string instrument, with only two strings, played mainly by the Albanians of northern and central Albania, Southern Montenegro, parts of North Macedonia and Kosovo.

The çifteli is frequently used by Albanians in weddings and at concerts, as well as by many musicians, such as Nikollë Nikprelaj. It is also used to accompany Albanian epics and ballads.

Construction
Çifteli vary in size, but are most often tuned to B3 and E4 (comparable to the top two strings of a guitar, which is classically tuned as "E2 A2 D3 G3 B3 E4"). Usually the lower string is played as a drone, with the melody played on the higher string. The çifteli is a fretted instrument, but unlike most, it is not fretted in a chromatic scale (one fret per semitone), but rather in a diatonic scale, with seven notes to the octave.

Etymology
The term çifteli is derived from Albanian "çift" ("double, pair") and "teli" ("wire, string"), so it takes the name from the number of strings used.

History
The çifteli originates from Albanian territories. It delivers a unique sound, melody and accompanies singing. The çifteli has an origin distinct from that of the instrument called "bağlama" (or "saz").

See also
 Tzouras
 Dutar, a Central Asian instrument, whose name means "two strings" in Persian
 Baglama
 Šargija, a baglama-like Balkan instrument
 Tanbur

References

String instruments
Albanian musical instruments